Matthias Maak (born 12 May 1992) is an Austrian footballer who plays for Austria Lustenau.

Club career
On 27 August 2020, he signed with Austria Lustenau.

Honours
Wacker Innsbruck
 Austrian Football First League: 2017–18

Austria Lustenau
 Austrian Football Second League: 2021–22

References

External links

Matthias Maak at ÖFB

Austrian footballers
1992 births
Living people
Austrian Football Bundesliga players
2. Liga (Austria) players
Austrian Regionalliga players
Danish Superliga players
SC Wiener Neustadt players
Kapfenberger SV players
SV Grödig players
SønderjyskE Fodbold players
FC Wacker Innsbruck (2002) players
SC Rheindorf Altach players
SC Austria Lustenau players
Austria under-21 international footballers
Association football midfielders
People from Bruck an der Mur
Austrian expatriate footballers
Austrian expatriate sportspeople in Denmark
Expatriate men's footballers in Denmark
Footballers from Styria